William Harrigan (March 27, 1894 – February 1, 1966) was an American actor who performed in Hollywood during the 1930s and 1940s and on stage.

Early years 
Harrigan was born in New York City and attended New York Military Academy. Harrigan was the son of actor Edward Harrigan and the grandson of composer David Braham. His sister was Nedda Harrigan, which made him the brother-in-law of director/playwright Joshua Logan.

Harrigan first performed on stage when he was 5 years old, joining his father in a production of Reilly and the 400 at the Garrick Theater. 

During World War I, Harrigan was a captain in the 307th Infantry Regiment of the 77th Division.

Career 
Following his school years, Harrigan acted in New York theaters in plays that included Bought and Paid For and Springtime. He also toured Australia in 1915 as part of a company led by Charles Millward.

Harrigan's Broadway debut was in Old Lavender (1906). He also performed with his father in a touring company of Old Lavender. In 1933 he played detective Charlie Chan in a Broadway adaptation of novel Keeper of the Keys. He created the role of the captain in the Broadway hit Mister Roberts, which his brother-in-law Joshua Logan co-wrote and directed.

Harrigan performed in vaudeville, including a 1927 performance of Irish ballads at the Palace Theater. His film debut came in 1917. Films in which he appeared included Born Reckless, Cabaret, The Invisible Man, and Nix on Dames.

Personal life and death 
Harrigan was married to, and divorced from, Dorothy Langdon and Louise Groody. At the time of his death he was married to Grace Culbert. He died on February 1, 1966, in New York City, aged 71.

Partial filmography

An Affair of Three Nations (1915) - Phillip Warwick
Cabaret (1927) - Jack Costigan
Nix on Dames (1927) - Johnny Brown
Born Reckless (1930) - Good News Brophy
On the Level (1930) - Danny Madden
Men on Call (1930) - Cap
Pick-Up (1933) - Jim Richards
The Girl in 419 (1933) - Peter Lawton
Disgraced! (1933) - Captain Holloway
The Invisible Man (1933) - Dr. Arthur Kemp
G Men (1935) - 'Mac' McKay
The People's Enemy (1935) - Henchman (uncredited)
Stranded (1935) - Updyke
Silk Hat Kid (1935) - Brother Joe Campbell
His Family Tree (1935) - Charles Murfree - aka Murphy
The Melody Lingers On (1935) - Captain Jonesy
Whipsaw (1935) - 'Doc' Evans
Frankie and Johnny (1936) - Curley
Over the Goal (1937) - Jim Shelly
Federal Bullets (1937) - Federal Agency Chief
Exiled to Shanghai (1937) - Grant Powell
Hawaii Calls (1938) - Blake
Back Door to Heaven (1939) - Frankie's Father
Arizona (1940) - Union Commanding Officer (uncredited)
Follies Girl (1943) - Jimmy Dobson
The Farmer's Daughter (1947) - Ward C. Hughes
Citizen Saint (1947) - Father Vail
Desert Fury (1947) - Judge Berle Lindquist
Flying Leathernecks (1951) - Dr. Lt.Cdr. Joe Curran
Steel Town (1952) - John 'Mac' McNamara
Francis Covers the Big Town (1953) - Deputy Chief Inspector Hansen
Roogie's Bump (1954) - Red O'Malley
Street of Sinners (1957) - Gus

References

Sources
moviefone

External links

1894 births
1966 deaths
American male film actors
20th-century American male actors
Male actors from New York (state)
Place of death missing